European route E 581 is a European B class road in Romania, Moldova and Ukraine.

Route 
 
 : Mărăşeşti (E85) - Crasna
 : Crasna - Albița
 
 : Leușeni - Chișinău
 : Chișinău
 : Chișinău - Pervomaisc
 
 : Kuchurhan - Odessa

External links 
 UN Economic Commission for Europe: Overall Map of E-road Network (2007)
 International E-road network

581
Roads in Romania
Roads in Moldova
European routes in Ukraine